Stephen Hilton is an English composer, record producer, YouTuber & influencer.

Filmography
Hilton's work on movie scores consists of about 50 Hollywood features including franchises like Pirates of the Caribbean, Madagascar, The Fast and Furious, Kung Fu Panda, The Amazing Spider-Man 2, Megamind, and four James Bond movies including The World Is Not Enough and Quantum of Solace. Other credits include Ocean's 11, 12 and 13, Moulin Rouge!, Shaft, Zoolander, The Bone Collector, Plunkett & Macleane, Analyze That, Buffalo Soldiers and Luc Besson's Kiss of the Dragon.

More recently, Hilton joined his wife, Internet celebrity Laura Clery, to form "Idiots Inc" – a digital media company, creating viral entertainment content and producing shows for TV / Digital and Commercials

Hilton wrote the original scores for New Town Killers, The Children, Cherrybomb, Salvage, Third Star, Sword of Vengeance and Kill Command among others. He also collaborated with composer David Holmes on Code 46, Haywire and Hunger, which received critical acclaim worldwide.

Musical career
Stephen produced acts such as  Gwen Stefani, Hans Zimmer, FKA Twigs, No Doubt, U2, Pharrell Williams, Jack White, Alicia Keys, Siouxsie Sioux,  Wale, Crystal Castles, Madonna, Moby, Dave Stewart, Depeche Mode, Ke$ha, Massive Attack, Mikky Ekko, Miguel, Shirley Bassey, Sky Ferreira,  Purity Ring, Alanis Morissette, Chris Lake, Moloko, Isaac Hayes, The Pet Shop Boys, Scott Walker, Pulp, David Holmes, Bomb the Bass, Melanie C, The Divine Comedy, Dirty Vegas, Martina Topley-Bird, Natasha Bedingfield, Joy Zipper, The John Spencer Blues Explosion, David Arnold, Trevor Horn and Rick Nowels.
He has also remixed songs by No Doubt, Sky Ferreira Orbital, Craig Armstrong and Primal Scream and provided many compositions for commercials for companies such as Apple (multiple spots), Ferrari / Shell, Mercedes, Audi, Guinness, VW, Levi's, Comme De Garcon, Sony, Renault Clio, Amex and Jean Paul Gaultier
Stephen composed, produced and mixed the music for the 83rd Oscars ACADEMY AWARDS cermenomy &  National Movie Awards.

The Free Association

Stephen and a band of Dobermans formed The Free Association with David Holmes. Together as a band of composers and producers they scored the futuristic love story, Code 46, directed by Michael Winterbottom. This resulted in a nomination for European Composer of the Year at the European Movie Awards. The Free Association also scored Bronwen Hughes' film Stander, based on a true story about South African chief of police in 1979.
The Free Association's album received critical acclaim and the band embarked on an extensive European tour, performing at Glastonbury, V2003, Kristiansand and Roskilde and on BBC's Later with Jools Holland.
The band's music features on a variety of car adverts, including a Renault Clio Campaign (UK) and a VW Campaign (Germany & Turkey). Other repertoire has been licensed to CSI (the American crime drama series) amongst other TV series.

FlyKKller

Stephen sometimes uses the moniker FlyKKiller (now called FLYKKLLR), his debut artist project . The album was reviewed by The Sunday Times & New York Times as the "best psyched up twisted soul record of the year". The band were lauded by the music press as one of the most important breakthrough acts of the year. His work is notable for integrating electronic music sounds with traditional orchestral arrangements.

Personal life
Hilton's first wife was artist Pati Yang. Hilton married second wife, internet celebrity and comedian Laura Clery in 2012 and frequently appears in her videos. On 15 November 2018, Hilton and Clery announced via Facebook they were expecting their first child. They now have two children, Alfie and Poppy. They currently reside in Los Angeles, California. In November 2021, Hilton revealed that he is autistic.

As of August 2022, Hilton and his wife decided to separate. As of 10 March 2023, Hilton stated in a video that he and Clery have officially divorced, with their children suffering the brunt of their emotional drama.

Credits

Scores (as composer)
2003
 Stander Composer
 Code 46 Composer
 
2011
"Transformers 3 Dark of the Moon" – additional music

2012
"Madagascar 3 Europes Most Wanted" producer of songs /  additional music / arranger
"The 84th Annual Academy Awards " additional music /arranger

2013
"Fast And Furious 6" additional music/arranger

2014
"The Pyramid Texts" Composer
"Kill Command" ComposerSword of Vengeance Composer
"The Big Leaf " (Def Jam films) Composer 
"Hungry Season 2 " (Def Jam films) Composer 
"The Amazing Spiderman 2"  Composer additional music /arranger
"Counting Backwrds" Composer
"Drugs INC"  Composer

2016
"Kong Skull Island" -composer  additional music 
"Jack Reacher Never Go Back" – composer additional music

2017
"The Predator" - composer additional music 
"Romans" - composer

Scores (as co-composer)

1999
 The World Is Not Enough The Bone Collector Plunkett & Macleane Best Laid Plans2000
 Shaft2001
 Buffalo Soldier Ocean's Eleven Kiss of the Dragon Moulin Rouge!2002
 Enough Analyze That Die Another Day2004
 Ocean's Twelve2005
 Four Brothers2007
 Ocean's Thirteen Hot Fuzz A Mighty Heart2008
 Quantum of Solace How To Lose Friends and Alienate People2010
"Megamind"
"How Do You Know"

2011
"The Dilema"
"Kung Fu Panda 2"
"Haywire"
"Assassin's Creed: Revelations"

2012
"The 84th Annual Academy Awards"
"Wrath of the Titans"
"Madagascar 3 Europes Most Wanted"
"Savages"

2013
"Kick Ass 2" (rmx)
"47 Ronin "
"The Great Gatsby"
GI Joe 2 : Retaliation"

2015
"Kung Fu Panda 3" – additional music

Music programming credits
1992
 The John Spencer Blues Explosion – Blues Explosion1998
 Depeche Mode – Only When I Lose Myself1999
 Pet Shop Boys – Nightlife ("In Denial")2002
 Pulp – We Love Life (5 tracks)2003
 Melanie C – Reason ("Home") Martina Topley-Bird – Quixotic ("Steve's (Day's of a Gun)") Moloko – Things To Make And Do ("The Time Is Now")2004
 The John Spencer Blues Explosion – Damage ("Spoiled", "You Been My Baby")2005
 Natasha Bedingfield – I Bruise Easily (4 track single) Doves – Black and White TownWork as composer/songwriter
 National Movie Awards Theme Flykkllr – Album Siouxsie Sioux – Drone Zone David Holmes – Forthcoming Album Pati Yang – Silent Treatment Pati Yang – All That Is Thirst Free Association – David Holmes Presents The Free Association Free Association – Come Get It, Got It Craig Armstrong – Amber Craig Armstrong – Starless Craig Armstrong – Ruthless Gravity Children – Sell My PulseRemixes
No Doubt – Settle Down
No Doubt – Lookin Hot
 Siouxsie Sioux – Here Comes That Day Primal Scream – Uptown Craig Armstrong – Glasgow Orbital – Gobsmack Kharma 45's – Political Soul Jacob Fletcher – Don't Go Down Answering Machine – Silent Hotels The 45 King – The 900 Number''

References

External links
 Flykkllr Official Website
 HotHouse Music
 

1974 births
Living people
English DJs
English composers
English record producers
People on the autism spectrum